Coffee with My Wife is a 2013 Indian Kannada-language directed by Vidyasagar starring Anish Tejeshwar and Sindhu Lokanath in lead roles.

Cast

Anish Tejeshwar as Charan
Sindhu Lokanath as Sindhu
Kumuda Gowda

Music

Reception

Critical response 
The Times of India scored the film at 2 out of 5 stars and says "Aneesh has done a good job with dialogue delivery and body language. Sindhu needs to improve her dialogue delivery. Richard Louis' track is good but could have been done better. Music by Mantra Anand and camera by Vishweshwara are okay". B S Srivani of Deccan Herald wrote "By the time the film picks up in the second half, interest dwindles to an insignificant speck. Barring Rani's mute act, the film fails to rise above mediocrity. Telugu cinema has already experimented with such urban themes. Coffee with my wife is just the latest addition". Sify wrote "Vishweshwar's camerawork is commendable, while Mantra Anand's music is average. Madan who is well known in the Telugu industry fails to conceptualize a good screenplay. All in all a mediocre film which fails to hold the audience's interest. It would be better to have a cup of coffee at the comfort of your home than watching Coffee With My Wife". A Sharadhaa of The New Indian Express wrote "Tejas justifies the role of a software engineer while Sindhu comes out of her homely image with this film. A mixture of comedy and drama - when it's funny, it's terrific. However the movie may not pander to audience's tastes much because 'breaking news' TV has desensitised them to such unnecesary prying into other's lives. The Verdict: A right film for newly-wed couples who can watch out for the romance and its after effects".

References

2010s Kannada-language films
2013 films